Saxinis sonorensis is a species of case-bearing leaf beetle in the family Chrysomelidae. It is found in Central America and North America.

Subspecies
These two subspecies belong to the species Saxinis sonorensis:
 Saxinis sonorensis scutellaris Schaeffer, 1906
 Saxinis sonorensis sonorensis Jacoby, 1889

References

Further reading

 

Clytrini
Articles created by Qbugbot
Beetles described in 1889